Flying High is a 1926 American silent action film directed by Charles Hutchison and starring William Fairbanks, Alice Calhoun and Frank Rice.

Cast
 William Fairbanks as Roy Cummins 
 Alice Calhoun as Patricia Barton 
 Frank Rice as Haines - the Mechanic 
 LeRoy Mason as Lester Swope 
 Jimmy Anderson as Carson 
 Cecile Cameron as Vera Owens 
 Joseph W. Girard as Col. Rockliffe Owens 
 James Gordon as V.E. Martin

References

Citations

Sources

External links

1926 films
1920s action films
American action films
Films directed by Charles Hutchison
American silent feature films
American black-and-white films
Gotham Pictures films
1920s English-language films
1920s American films